Ryo Watanabe may refer to:

, Japanese baseball player
, Japanese baseball player
, Japanese football player
, Japanese football player